Lin Hong-tsung (born 29 October 1951) is a Taiwanese businessman and politician who served in the Legislative Yuan from 1990 to 1993 and again between 1996 and 2002.

Lin attended  and earned a master's degree from Nankai University. He was active in a few Buddhist organizations and ran his own construction company.

He was elected to the Legislative Yuan for the first time in 1989, and won consecutive terms in 1995 and 1998. Lin ran again in 2001, and was defeated. During his tenure as legislator, he called for the Ministry of Justice Investigation Bureau to become an independent ministry.

References

1951 births
Living people
Kuomintang Members of the Legislative Yuan in Taiwan
Members of the 1st Legislative Yuan in Taiwan
Members of the 3rd Legislative Yuan
Members of the 4th Legislative Yuan
Kaohsiung Members of the Legislative Yuan
Nankai University alumni